Patchogue-Medford School District is a public school district that covers approximately  in the southern part of the Town of Brookhaven, Suffolk County, New York, United States.

It is composed of the villages and hamlets of Patchogue, Medford, East Patchogue and North Patchogue.

The total student population as of 2006–2007 was approximately 8,700 students.

Suburban growth starting in the 1950s led to a student population peak in the 1970s of about 11,000 students, which later dropped to a low of 7,000 before rising again to the current level.

Schools

High school
 Patchogue-Medford High School

Middle schools
 Oregon Middle School
 Saxton Middle School
 South Ocean Middle School

Elementary schools
 Barton Elementary School
 Bay Elementary School
 Canaan Elementary School
 Eagle Elementary School
 Medford Elementary School
 River Elementary School
 Tremont Elementary School

References

External links
 Patchogue-Medford School District

Education in Suffolk County, New York
School districts in New York (state)
School districts established in 1854